Saint-Gilles is a village located along the west coast of the island of Réunion, in the commune of Saint-Paul.  It is the site of the island's most popular seaside resort.

Beaches 
Boucan  and Roches Noires are popular surfing spots.
The beach of Hermitage is protected by a corral reef and is part of the protected area of the marine park of Réunion

other attractions 
 the Casino of Saint-Gilles
 The Garden of Eden - a botanical garden
 the sea aquarium inside of the port of Saint-Gilles
 the waterfalls of Saint-Gilles river at Bassin Cormorans and Aigrettes
 whale watching targeting especially for Humpback whales, organized by the OMAR (Observatoire Marin de la Réunion) and Globice (Groupe local d'observation et d'identification des cétacés)
 the Grand Boucan - a carnival like popular party that takes place in June.
 Grotte de l’Autel, a cave discovered in 1980. Known for its subfossil remains of extinct birds.

External links

References

Populated places in Réunion
Surfing locations in Réunion